This is a list of notable footballers who have played for Leicester City, although it includes players who were with the club when it was called Leicester Fosse. The aim is for this list to include all players that have played 100 or more senior matches and/or scored 50 or more senior goals for the club. Other players who have played an important role for the club can also be included, but the reason for their notability should be included in the 'Notes' column.
For a list of all Leicester City players, major or minor, with a Wikipedia article, see :Category:Leicester City F.C. players, and for the current squad see the main Leicester City F.C. article.

Explanation of list
Players should be listed in chronological order according to the year in which they first played for the club, and then by alphabetical order of their surname. Appearances and goals should include substitute appearances, but exclude wartime matches and games played in the Texaco Cup, Anglo-Scottish Cup, Anglo-Italian Cup, and FA Cup third place play-off. Further information on competitions/seasons which are regarded as eligible for appearance stats are provided below (dependent on the years at which the player was at the club), and if any data is not available for any of these competitions an appropriate note should be added to the table.

List of players
Statistics correct as of 18 March 2023.

(n/a) = Information not available
Players in bold are still playing for the club.

Notes
 Includes Football League Play-Offs, UEFA Cup Winners' Cup, UEFA Cup, Charity and Community Shield, Football League Trophy and Full Members Cup  matches.

References 
 
 Leicester City All-time top appearances - FoxesTalk
 Post-war Football League Player statistics
 Filbertstreet.net Player statistics for selected Leicester players
 Site breaks down appearances into Lge/FAC/Lge Cup/Europe but does not appear to include substitute appearances
 Soccerbase stats (use Search for...on left menu and select 'Players' drop down)

Players
 
Leicester City
football
Association football player non-biographical articles